The Prague Military Parade of 2018 was a military parade in the Czech Republic which took place on Prague's European Street on 28 October 2018. It took place as part of the 3-day centennial celebrations of the founding of Czechoslovakia in 1918. The parade was the first of its kind in 10 years and the largest in the country since the 1985 Victory Parade. It saw over 4,000 Czech and Slovak military personnel take part in the event, which included troops the United Kingdom, France, Italy and the United States. Czech President Milos Zeman presided over the parade as foreign dignitaries, such as Slovak Prime Minister Peter Pellegrini and U.S Defense Secretary James Mattis watched.

References

External links

Military parades
2018 in the Czech Republic
2018 in military history
Military history of the Czech Republic
Events in Prague
October 2018 events in Europe
2010s in Prague